FC Baranovichi is a Belarusian football club based in Baranavichy, Brest Oblast. Their home stadium is Lokomotiv Stadium, Baranavichy. The club was founded in 1945 and had changed its name several times during its history. Team colors are red and blue.

History 
The club was established in 1945 as Lokomotiv Baranovichi. Throughout the history the club was reattached to various local organizations and industries and its name was changed accordingly. The club participated in Belarusian SSR league and later in lower tiers of Belarusian championship as Lokomotiv Baranovichi (1945, 1950–1952, 1961, 1963–1964, 1968–1984), Baranovichi military unit (1946), Dinamo Baranovichi (1947–1949), Pischevik Baranovichi (1953–1956), Baranovichi city team (1957–1959), Kombinat Baranovichi (1960), Salyut Baranovichi (1962), Tekstilschik Baranovichi (1965–1967, 1985–1989, 1993), Baranovichi (1990), Khimik Baranovichi (1991–1992),  Metapol Baranovichi (1993–1995).

Since 1995 the club is permanently known as FC Baranovichi.

Current squad 
As of March 2023

References

External links 	 
 Unfficial website
 

Baranovichi
 
1945 establishments in Belarus
Association football clubs established in 1945
Baranavichy